Ježek (feminine Ježková) is a Czech surname meaning hedgehog. Notable people include:

 Bohuslav Ježek (1877–1950), Czech mineralogist
 Jaromír Ježek (born 1986), Czech judoka
 Jaroslav Ježek  (1906–1942), Czech composer
 Jaroslav Ježek (1923–2002), Czech designer
 Jaroslav Ježek (1926–1998), Czech designer
 Jiří Ježek (born 1974), Czech cyclist and Paralympian
 Josef Ježek, Czech politician 
 Kenneth Jezek, American actor, dancer
 Linda Jezek (born 1960), American swimmer
 Patrik Ježek (born 1976), Czech football (soccer) midfielder
 Petr Ježek, Czech politician
 Robert Jezek, Canadian actor
 Stanislav Ježek (born 1976), Czech slalom canoer
 Václav Ježek (1923–1995), Czech football coach

Czech-language surnames